Sogn og Fjordane is one of the 19 multi-member constituencies of the Storting, the national legislature of Norway. The constituency was established in 1921 following the introduction of proportional representation for elections to the Storting. It consists of the municipalities of Årdal, Askvoll, Aurland, Bremanger, Fjaler, Gloppen, Gulen, Høyanger, Hyllestad, Kinn, Lærdal, Luster, Sogndal, Solund, Stad, Stryn, Sunnfjord and Vik in the county of Vestland. The constituency currently elects three of the 169 members of the Storting using the open party-list proportional representation electoral system. At the 2021 parliamentary election it had 78,282 registered electors.

Electoral system
Sogn og Fjordane currently elects three of the 169 members of the Storting using the open party-list proportional representation electoral system. Constituency seats are allocated by the County Electoral Committee using the Modified Sainte-Laguë method. Compensatory seats (seats at large) are calculated based on the national vote and are allocated by the National Electoral Committee using the Modified Sainte-Laguë method at the constituency level (one for each constituency). Only parties that reach the 4% national threshold compete for compensatory seats.

Election results

Summary

(Excludes compensatory seats. Figures in italics represent joint lists.)

Detailed

2020s

2021
Results of the 2021 parliamentary election held on 13 September 2021:

The following candidates were elected:
Alfred Bjørlo (V); Olve Grotle (H); Erling Sande (Sp); and Torbjørn Vereide (Ap).

2010s

2017
Results of the 2017 parliamentary election held on 11 September 2017:

The following candidates were elected:
Ingrid Heggø (Ap); Frida Melvær (H); Liv Signe Navarsete (Sp); and Tore Storehaug (KrF).

2013
Results of the 2013 parliamentary election held on 8 and 9 September 2013:

The following candidates were elected:
Ingrid Heggø (Ap); Bjørn Lødemel (H); Liv Signe Navarsete (Sp); and Sveinung Rotevatn (V).

2000s

2009
Results of the 2009 parliamentary election held on 13 and 14 September 2009:

The following candidates were elected:
Tor Bremer (Ap); Ingrid Heggø (Ap); Bjørn Lødemel (H); Liv Signe Navarsete (Sp); and Åge Starheim (FrP).

2005
Results of the 2005 parliamentary election held on 11 and 12 September 2005:

The following candidates were elected:
Ingrid Heggø (Ap); Gunvald Ludvigsen (V); Liv Signe Navarsete (Sp); Reidar Sandal (Ap);  and Åge Starheim (FrP).

2001
Results of the 2001 parliamentary election held on 9 and 10 September 2001:

The following candidates were elected:
Magne Aarøen (KrF); Sverre J. Hoddevik (H); Jorunn Ringstad (Sp); Heidi Grande Røys (SV); and Reidar Sandal (Ap).

1990s

1997
Results of the 1997 parliamentary election held on 15 September 1997:

The following candidates were elected:
Sverre J. Hoddevik (H); Lars Gunnar Lie (KrF); Astrid Marie Nistad (Ap); Kjell Opseth (Ap); and Jorunn Ringstad (Sp).

1993
Results of the 1993 parliamentary election held on 12 and 13 September 1993:

The following candidates were elected:
Håkon Steinar Giil (Sp); Lars Gunnar Lie (KrF); Astrid Marie Nistad (Ap); Kjell Opseth (Ap); and Jorunn Ringstad (Sp).

1980s

1989
Results of the 1989 parliamentary election held on 10 and 11 September 1989:

The following candidates were elected:
Leiv Blakset (Sp); Dagfinn Hjertenes (H); Lars Gunnar Lie (KrF); Kjell Opseth (Ap); and Astrid Marie Nistad (Ap).

1985
Results of the 1985 parliamentary election held on 8 and 9 September 1985:

The following candidates were elected:
Leiv Blakset (Sp); Lars Lefdal (H); Lars Gunnar Lie (KrF); Kjell Opseth (Ap); and Kåre Øvregard (Ap).

1981
Results of the 1981 parliamentary election held on 13 and 14 September 1981:

The following candidates were elected:
Per J. Husabø (KrF); Lars Lefdal (H); Kjell Opseth (Ap); Kåre Øvregard (Ap); and Ambjørg Sælthun (Sp).

1970s

1977
Results of the 1977 parliamentary election held on 11 and 12 September 1977:

The following candidates were elected:
Oddleif Fagerheim (Ap); Per J. Husabø (KrF); Lars Lefdal (H); Kåre Øvregard (Ap); and Ambjørg Sælthun (Sp).

1973
Results of the 1973 parliamentary election held on 9 and 10 September 1973:

The following candidates were elected:
John Austrheim (Sp); Oddleif Fagerheim (Ap); Sverre Johan Juvik (Ap); Knut Myrstad (KrF); and Ambjørg Sælthun (Sp).

1960s

1969
Results of the 1969 parliamentary election held on 7 and 8 September 1969:

The following candidates were elected:
John Austrheim (Sp); Oddleif Fagerheim (Ap); Sverre Johan Juvik (Ap); Knut Myrstad (KrF); and Paul Svarstad (H).

1965
Results of the 1965 parliamentary election held on 12 and 13 September 1965:

The following candidates were elected:
John Austrheim (Sp); Ludvig Olai Botnen (V); Knut Myrstad (KrF); Einar Stavang (Ap); and Paul Svarstad (H).

1961
Results of the 1961 parliamentary election held on 11 September 1961:

The following candidates were elected:
John Austrheim (Sp), 9,550 votes; Ludvig Olai Botnen (V), 7,257 votes; Hans Offerdal (Ap), 16,111 votes; Hans Karolus Ommedal (KrF), 6,936 votes; and Einar Stavang (Ap), 16,104 votes.

1950s

1957
Results of the 1957 parliamentary election held on 7 October 1957:

The following candidates were elected:
Anders Johanneson Bøyum (V); Per Severin Hjermann (Bp); Hans Offerdal (Ap); Hans Karolus Ommedal (KrF); and Einar Stavang (Ap).

1953
Results of the 1953 parliamentary election held on 12 October 1953:

The following candidates were elected:
Anders Johanneson Bøyum (V); Per Severin Hjermann (Bp); Ivar Jacobsen Norevik (Ap); Hans Karolus Ommedal (KrF); and Einar Stavang (Ap).

1940s

1949
Results of the 1949 parliamentary election held on 10 October 1949:

The following candidates were elected:
Anders Johanneson Bøyum (V); Jakob Mathias Antonson Lothe (V); Jens Lunde (Bp); Ivar Jacobsen Norevik (Ap); and Einar Stavang (Ap).

1945
Results of the 1945 parliamentary election held on 8 October 1945:

The following candidates were elected:
Anders Johanneson Bøyum (V); Jakob Mathias Antonson Lothe (V); Jens Lunde (Bp); Ivar Jacobsen Norevik (Ap); and Einar Stavang (Ap).

1930s

1936
Results of the 1936 parliamentary election held on 19 October 1936:

As the list alliance was not entitled to more seats contesting as an alliance than it was contesting as individual parties, the distribution of seats was as party votes.

The following candidates were elected:
Anders Ananias Andersen Hammerseth (H); Gjert Andreasson Hegrenæs (Bp); Anders A. Lothe (Ap); Jakob Mathias Antonson Lothe (V); and Hans Kristian Seip (V).

1933
Results of the 1933 parliamentary election held on 16 October 1933:

The following candidates were elected:
Gjert Andreasson Hegrenæs (Bp); Peder Thorsen Hovland (Bp); Anders A. Lothe (Ap); Jakob Mathias Antonson Lothe (V); and Hans Kristian Seip (V).

1930
Results of the 1930 parliamentary election held on 20 October 1930:

The following candidates were elected:
Gjert Andreasson Hegrenæs (Bp); Peder Thorsen Hovland (Bp); Jens Hermundson Kvale (V); Jakob Mathias Antonson Lothe (V); and Paul Johan Hansen Takle (H).

1920s

1927
Results of the 1927 parliamentary election held on 17 October 1927:

The following candidates were elected:
Gjert Andreasson Hegrenæs (Bp); Per Klingenberg Hestetun (V); Kristofer Indrehus (V); Anders A. Lothe (Ap); and Anfin Øen (Bp).

1924
Results of the 1924 parliamentary election held on 21 October 1924:

The following candidates were elected:
Ingolf Elster Christensen (H-FV); Per Klingenberg Hestetun (V); Kristofer Indrehus (V); Jakob Mathias Antonson Lothe (V); and Anfin Øen (Bp).

1921
Results of the 1921 parliamentary election held on 24 October 1921:

The following candidates were elected:
Ingolf Elster Christensen (H-FV); Elias Faleide (V); Per Klingenberg Hestetun (V); Kristofer Indrehus (V); and Anfin Øen (L).

Notes

References

Storting constituency
Storting constituencies
Storting constituencies established in 1921